Erik Boström (23 August 1869 – 13 June 1932) was a Swedish sport shooter who competed in the 1912 Summer Olympics. He won the silver medal in the 50 metre military pistol team event and finished  fifth in the 50 m pistol, eighth in the 50 m rifle, prone, and 17th in the 30 m rapid fire pistol.

References

External links

profile

1869 births
1932 deaths
Swedish male sport shooters
ISSF pistol shooters
ISSF rifle shooters
Olympic shooters of Sweden
Shooters at the 1912 Summer Olympics
Olympic silver medalists for Sweden
Olympic medalists in shooting
Medalists at the 1912 Summer Olympics
Sport shooters from Stockholm
20th-century Swedish people